Codalet is a commune in the Pyrénées-Orientales department in southern France.

It is very small with only a few streets but has much character. There are no shops but there is a little park with a boules court and soccer goal as well as a river running through it. Codalet has an annual garage sale for the May Day celebrations which takes place in the Codalet square. There is also the annual Flama del Canigou festival in the Prades Park.

Geography

Localisation 
Codalet is located in the canton of Les Pyrénées catalanes and in the arrondissement of Prades.

Population

Sites of interest 
Saint-Michel-de-Cuxa abbey is located on the territory of the commune.

See also
Communes of the Pyrénées-Orientales department

References

Communes of Pyrénées-Orientales